Chimeras (sub-titled A Child’s Adventures in the Realms of the Unreal) is an album of contemporary classical music by American composer John Zorn featuring a 12 part piece inspired by Arnold Schoenberg's atonal composition "Pierrot Lunaire". In 2010 the album was revised and re-recorded, with an additional "Postlude".

Reception

The Allmusic site awarded the album 3½ stars. 
Writing for Pitchfork Media,  Alexander Lloyd Linhardt stated "the piece itself is thrillingly diverse, suddenly going from luminous to lugubrious and from classical to chaotic. It's a bold, unexpected new chapter in Zorn's corpus, or it would be if we didn't expect that from him".
The Free Jazz Collective stated "it can be described as an absolute musical nightmare. It is dark, frightening, with light touches beaming through, like a lullaby arising out of violence, like a tiny light in the darkness giving you false hope of rescue, like friendly faces turning into gargoyles. Human warmth is present, but only as a delusion or deception... The music is as ambitious as it is pretentious, although it will not leave you indifferent".

Track listing
All compositions by John Zorn
 "One" – 0:55
 "Two" – 2:42
 "Three" – 2:54
 "Four" – 2:05
 "Five" – 1:45
 "Six" – 2:08
 "Seven" – 4:38
 "Eight" – 3:19
 "Nine" – 2:45
 "Ten" – 2:53
 "Interlude" – 1:24 Track 4 on 2010 reissue
 "Eleven" – 3:18
 "Twelve" – 2:50
 "Postlude" - 0:16 Bonus track on 2010 reissue

Personnel
 Ilana Davidson – voice  (tracks 2-5, 7, 8, 10, 12 & 13)
 Elizabeth Farnum – voice (tracks 10 & 12)
 Jennifer Choi – violin  (tracks 1, 4, 5, 6, 8, 9 & 12)
 Fred Sherry – cello (tracks 1, 4, 6, 8, 9, 12 & 13) 
 Tara O'Connor – piccolo, flute, alto flute, bass flute (tracks 1, 3, 4, 6, 9, 10 & 12)
 Michael Lowenstern – bass clarinet, clarinet  (tracks 1, 4, 6, 9 & 12)  
 Stephen Drury – piano, organ, celesta (tracks 1-3, 6, 8, 9, 12 & 13)
 William Winant – percussion (tracks 1, 3, 5-7 & 9-13) 
 Brad Lubman – conductor

References

2003 albums
Albums produced by John Zorn
John Zorn albums
Tzadik Records albums